Gubser is a surname. Notable people with the surname include:

Charles Gubser (1916–2011), American politician
Kim Gubser (born 2000), Swiss freestyle skier
Robin Gubser (born 1991), Liechtensteiner footballer
Steven Gubser (1972–2019), American physicist